P. Balachandran  is an Indian politician serving as the MLA of Thrissur Constituency since May 2021.

References 

Kerala MLAs 2021–2026
Communist Party of India politicians from Kerala
Year of birth missing (living people)
Living people
Politicians from Thrissur